Schipkau is a municipality in the Oberspreewald-Lausitz district, in Lower Lusatia, Brandenburg, Germany.

Geography
The municipality is located in the north of the historical region of Lusatia, close to the motorway A13, connecting Berlin with Dresden.

Schipkau counts 5 civil parishes (Ortsteile): Annahütte, Drochow, Hörlitz, Klettwitz and Meuro.

History
From 1815 to 1947, Schipkau was part of the Prussian Province of Brandenburg. From 1952 to 1990, it was part of the Bezirk Cottbus of East Germany.

Demography

Sport

Close to Klettwitz and in north of Schipkau it is located the "EuroSpeedway Lausitz", a race track originally named "Lausitzring".

People Joachim Lurkowski
Joachim Klaus Lurkowski

born Jan8,1936 Past April 2021

References

External links

Populated places in Oberspreewald-Lausitz